Château Angélus, until 1990 known as Château L'Angélus, or simply L'Angélus, is a Bordeaux wine from the appellation Saint-Émilion, since 2012 ranked Premier grand cru classé (A) in the Classification of Saint-Émilion wine. The winery is located on the Right Bank of the Bordeaux wine region, in the commune of Saint-Émilion in the department Gironde.

The château also produces a second wine named Carillon d’Angélus.

History
The estate has been owned by the Boüard de Laforest family since the Domaine de Mazerat was bequeathed to Comte Maurice de Boüard de Laforest in 1910, and expanded by the acquisition of Clos de L'Angélus in 1922 by Elisabeth Bouchet his wife and a plot from Château Beau-Séjour Bécot in 1969. The name refers to the three Angelus bells audible from the vineyards, coming from the chapel at Mazerat, the church in Saint-Martin de Mazerat and Saint-Émilion. 

Hubert de Boüard de Laforest joined the family business at Angélus in 1976 having concluded studies under Émile Peynaud at the Faculté d'Oenologie in Bordeaux. Along with several modernising changes, the practice of maturing in new oak was begun in 1980. The estate has been classified as a Premier grand cru cru classé (A) since 2012, was previously a Premier grand cru cru classé (B) since 1996, and was before that classified as Grand cru classé. But according to research of journalist Isabelle Saporta, Hubert de Boüard is judge and jury in the preparation of the classification.
In 2018, the co-owner Hubert de Bouard has been charged with seeking to unfairly influence the outcome of the coveted Saint-Emilion Grand Cru Classé rankings in his favour.

Angélus is currently managed by Hubert de Boüard, with the consultancy of the oenologist Michel Rolland.

Production
The estate consists of 23.4 hectares with a grape variety of 51% Merlot, 47% Cabernet Franc and 2% Cabernet Sauvignon. The annual production averages 10,000 cases of the Grand vin and 1,000 cases of the second wine.

References

External links
 Château Angélus official site 

Bordeaux wine producers